Ladson is a surname. Notable people with the surname include:
James Ladson (1753–1812), American politician, plantation owner, and military officer
James H. Ladson (1795–1868), American planter, businessman, and consul
Sarah Reeve Ladson, American socialite and arts patron
Rick Ladson (1984–), Australian footballer

See also 

 Ladson family